Clube Atlético Castelo Branco, commonly known as Castelo Branco, is a Brazilian football club based in Rio de Janeiro city, Rio de Janeiro state.

History
The club was founded on November 9, 1990, by the Universidade Castelo Branco college. The club competed in their first professional competition in 2007, when they were eliminated in the Third Stage of the Campeonato Carioca Third Level.

Stadium

Clube Atlético Castelo Branco play their home games at Estádio Proletário Guilherme da Silveira Filho, better known as Estádio Moça Bonita, located in Bangu neighborhood. The stadium has a maximum capacity of 9,564 people.

References

Association football clubs established in 1990
Football clubs in Rio de Janeiro (state)
University and college association football clubs
1990 establishments in Brazil